Batres is a small town and municipality in the autonomous community of Madrid in central Spain.  The town as is known today was founded in the 12th century after it was recaptured by Christians from the Almoravids, or north African settlers.

Tourism     
 
The town is a popular destination because of Batres Castle, which is the main tourist attraction.

External links 
Pueblo de Batres (in Spanish)

References

Municipalities in the Community of Madrid